Vera T. Sós (born September 11, 1930) is a Hungarian mathematician, specializing in number theory and combinatorics. She was a student and close collaborator of both Paul Erdős and Alfréd Rényi. She also collaborated frequently with her husband Pál Turán, the analyst, number theorist, and combinatorist (the letter T in her name stands for Turán). Until 1987, she worked at the Department of Analysis at the Eötvös Loránd University, Budapest. Since then, she has been employed by the Alfréd Rényi Institute of Mathematics. She was elected a corresponding member (1985), member (1990) of the Hungarian Academy of Sciences. In 1997, Sós was awarded the Széchenyi Prize.

One of her results is the Kővári–Sós–Turán theorem concerning the maximum possible number of edges in a bipartite graph that does not contain certain complete subgraphs. 
Another is the following so-called friendship theorem proved with Paul Erdős and Alfréd Rényi: if, in a finite graph, any two vertices have exactly one common neighbor, then some vertex is joined to all others. In number theory, Sós proved the three-gap theorem, conjectured by Hugo Steinhaus and proved independently by Stanisław Świerczkowski.

Life and career
Vera Sós is the daughter of a school teacher. As an adolescent, Sós attended the Abonyi Street Jewish highschool in Budapest and graduated in 1948. She was later introduced to Alfréd Rényi and Paul Erdős, who she later collaborated with, by her teacher Tibor Gallai. (Together she and Erdős have thirty joint papers.) Sós considered Gallai to be the person who discovered her gift for mathematics. Sós was also one of three girls out of all the girls in Gallai's class that became a mathematician. Sós later attended Eötvös Loránd University. There, she studied as a mathematics and physics major and graduated in 1952. Although she was still a student, Sós taught at Eötvös University in 1950. At the age of twenty, Sós attended a Mathematical Congress in Budapest, Hungary and attended a summer internship. Sós met her husband and collaborator Paul Turán in college. They married in 1952. The two had two children in 1953 and 1960, Gyorgy and Thomas Turan. Turán died in September 1976.

In 1965, Sós began the weekly Hajnal–Sós seminar at the Mathematical Institute of the Hungarian Academy for Science with András Hajnal. The seminar is considered to be a "forum for new results in combinatorics." This weekly seminar continues to this day.

Throughout her years working in mathematics, Sós has been honored with many awards as a result of her work. One of the many awards includes the Széchenyi Prize, which she received in 1997. The Széchenyi Prize is an award given to those who have greatly contributed to the academic life of Hungary.

Awards
 member of Academia Europaea: 2013
 Széchenyi Prize: 1997
 Academic Award: 1983
 Cross of the Hungarian Order of Merit: 2002
 Tibor Szele Medal: 1974

Selected publications

Notes

References
 MTI Ki Kicsoda [Who's Who] 2009, Magyar Távirati Iroda Zrt., Budapest, 2008, pp. 1130., 
 A Magyar Tudományos Akadémia tagjai 1825–2002 III. (R–ZS). [Members of the Hungarian Academy of Sciences 1825–2002, volume III.]  Ed. Ferenc Glatz. Budapest: MTA Társadalomkutató Központ, 2003, pp. 1155–1156.
 "T. Sós Vera: Rend, Rendezetlenség és Ami a Kettő Között Van." Lecture. 6 Nov. 2010. YouTube. YouTube, 24 Jan. 2012. Web. 20 Apr. 2013. <https://www.youtube.com/watch?v=c39uLbMGNEo>.
 "Magyar Tudományos Akadémia (Hungarian Academy of Sciences)." MTA. N.p., n.d. Web. 20 Apr. 2013. <http://mta.hu/koztestuleti_tagok?PersonId=19476>.
 "A Matematikus T. Sós Vera 75 éves (The Mathematician Vera Sos 75 Years Old)." http://www.nol.hu. N.p., n.d. Web. <http://www.nol.hu/archivum/archiv-376708>.
Babai, László (2001). "In and Out of Hungary: Paul Erdős, His Friends, and Times" (PostScript). University of Chicago. Retrieved 2008-06-22.<https://web.archive.org/web/20070207131035/http://www.cs.uchicago.edu/files/tr_authentic/TR-2001-03.ps>
 Sos, Vera T. "A Matematika Professzor Asszonya." Interview. A Matematika Professzor Asszonya. N.p., n.d. Web. 20 Apr. 2013. <http://www.termeszetvilaga.hu/tv2000/tv0009/matematika.html>.

External links
 (in Hungarian), lecture given by Sós on November 6, 2010

1930 births
20th-century Hungarian mathematicians
Number theorists
Combinatorialists
Members of Academia Europaea
Living people
20th-century women mathematicians